Stibadocerella is a genus of crane fly in the family Cylindrotomidae.

Biology
The larvae of the genus Stibadocerella live on mosses. Adults are to be found in damp wooded habitats.

Distribution
Taiwan, China, Indonesia, Malaysia, India.

Species
S. albitarsis (de Meijere, 1919)
S. formosensis Alexander, 1929
S. omeiensis Alexander, 1936
S. pristina Brunetti, 1918

References

Cylindrotomidae
Diptera of Asia
Taxa named by Enrico Adelelmo Brunetti